Nkuwu a Ntinu (Portuguese: Encu a Motino) (c. 1422-c. 1470) was the fourth manikongo from the Lukeni kanda dynasty to rule the Kingdom of Kongo and reigned during the mid 15th century between c. 1450 and c. 1470.

Background
Manikongo Nkuwu a Ntinu was the son of the Kongo's founder, Lukeni lua Nimi.  Little is known about him or his reign other than he did not rule until after both his cousins had been king. This was required of the kingdom's founder to keep the young state together. King Nkuwu a Ntinu was the father of Nzinga a Nkuwu, the king ruling Kongo when the Portuguese arrived in 1483. King Nkuwu a Ntinu was the last of the pre-Christian kings of Kongo.

See also
List of rulers of Kongo
Kingdom of Kongo

Kongolese royalty
Manikongo of Kongo
15th-century monarchs in Africa